Beraunti is a village in Bihar in Nalanda district of Bihar State, India. The village is administrated by Sarpanch an elected representative of the village.

Demography 
, The village has a total number of 301 houses and the population of 1742 of which include 951 are males while 791 are females.

References

Cities and towns in Nalanda district